Malika Hadky (born 1952) is a Moroccan middle-distance runner. She competed in the women's 800 metres at the 1972 Summer Olympics.

References

1952 births
Living people
Athletes (track and field) at the 1972 Summer Olympics
Moroccan female middle-distance runners
Olympic athletes of Morocco
Place of birth missing (living people)